Edward Acton may refer to:

 Edward Acton (MP for Shropshire), 14th-century English politician
 Edward Acton (Royal Navy officer) (died 1707), captain in the Royal Navy
 Edward Acton (cricketer) (1871–1912), West Indian cricketer
 Sir Edward Acton, 1st Baronet (1600–1659)
 Sir Edward Acton, 3rd Baronet (c. 1650–1716), British MP
 Sir Edward Acton (judge) (1865–1945), English judge
 Edward Acton (academic) (born 1949), Vice-Chancellor of the University of East Anglia (2009–2014)